The Chenouis or Chenoua (in Berber: Icenwiyen) are a Berber-speaking population native to Algeria. They are concentrated in the west-central mountains.

The traditional area goes from Fouka (Tipaza province) until Ténès (Chlef province).

Population
The Chenoui speaking population is traditionally composed of several tribes: Cenwa (Tipaza), Guraya (Tipaza), Ayt Mnaser (Beni Menacer) (Cherchell), Ayt Farah, Arib, Zuzug (Ain Defla), Ayt Hawa (Ténès) and the Bissa mounts (Chlef).

Berber language
The Chenoui language which is a Northern Berber language is closely related to the Shawiya language and Zenata varieties spoken by Berbers of the Aures mountains in Eastern Algeria and the Rif region.

Geographical distribution

The Chenoui traditional territory includes the province of Tipaza, parts of the Chlef province and the north of the province of Ain Defla, and thus are called in reference to the Mount Chenoua which dominates the city of Tipaza, 70 km west of Algiers.

The region is part of the greater Dahra region, a long mountainous region along the Meditternean coasts, separated from the Ouarsenis range by the Chelif river and its valley. It expands from 8 km north of Mostaganem until the Algiers Sahel with its highest point being Mount Zaccar (Miliana).

The Chenoua Mount region, highest point of the Algiers Sahel, is the most eastern part of the Chenoui speaking region going from Fouka (42 km west of Algiers) until Tenès (200 km west of Algiers) or even heading further west till Ouled Boughalem in the past. Some people call them the Chelhas of the Tell or even Kabyles of the west.

Berber peoples and tribes
Berbers in Algeria
Ethnic groups in Algeria
Indigenous peoples of North Africa